Kandachipuram is a village in the Kandachipuram taluk of Viluppuram district, in the Indian state of Tamil Nadu. It is the headquarters of its namesake taluk, but was previously in Tirukkoyilur taluk, when that taluk and the entirety of Kallakurichi district were still part of Villupuram district.

Geography
The village is at the intersection of National Highway 38 and State Highway 211.

Demographics
In 2011 Kandachipuram had a population of 6,659 people living in 1,595 households. 3,325 (49.93%) of the inhabitants were male, while 3,334 (50.07%) were female. 723 children in the town, about 10.9% of the population, were at or below the age of 6. 69.0% of the population was literate, with the male rate of 75.6% being notably higher than the female rate of 62.4%. Scheduled Castes and Scheduled Tribes accounted for 23.3% and 3.66% of the population, respectively.

References

Villages in Viluppuram district